The Football Association of Montenegro (Montenegrin: Fudbalski savez Crne Gore, FSCG / Фудбалски савез Црне Горе, ФСЦГ) is the governing body of football in Montenegro. It is based in the capital, Podgorica.

The FSCG organises the Montenegrin First, Second and Third Leagues, which between them contain 45 clubs. It also organises the Montenegrin Women's League and the men's and women's Montenegrin Cups, as well as the Montenegro national football team and the Montenegro national under-21 football team.

The FSCG was established in 1931 as a sub-association within the Football Association of Yugoslavia. From 2003 until Montenegro declared independence in 2006, the FSCG was a sub-association within the Football Association of Serbia and Montenegro. It became a UEFA member in its own right in January 2007, and a FIFA member in May 2007.

Former player Dejan Savićević has served as the FSCG's president since 2004.

History
The Football Association of Montenegro was founded on 8 March 1931, under the name Cetinjski fudbalski podsavez ("Cetinje Football Subassociation") as a subdivision of the Football Association of Yugoslavia.

The Football Association of Montenegro was a part of the Football Association of Yugoslavia, the Football Association of FR Yugoslavia, and the Football Association of Serbia and Montenegro. On 28 June 2006 the Association became independent, following Montenegro becoming an independent country earlier that month. On 30 June 2006, it applied for membership in UEFA and FIFA. The Association joined UEFA on 26 January 2007 and joined FIFA on 31 May 2007.

Camp FSCG and House of Football

Since 2008, the Football Association of Montenegro has owned one of the most modern training grounds in the Balkan peninsula. Built in 2007, the centre is 54,000 sq meters. It is located on Ćemovsko polje, a plain at the Podgorica outskirts between the settlements of Stari Aerodrom and Konik. It consists of six pitches with stands and floodlights, and the House of Football - a seat of the Football Association of Montenegro.

Camp currently represents an important asset for the whole Montenegrin football system. Its grounds are home to all Montenegrin national teams (men and women) and numerous teams from Podgorica. The fields meet the criteria for Montenegrin First League games and UEFA competitions for young players.

House of Football
House of Football (Kuća fudbala) is a seat of the Football Association of Montenegro. The building opened on 21 May 2016.
On 3,240 sq meters, the building has modern facilities including reception, a museum, a press hall, the TV FSCG seat, administrative offices and meeting rooms.

FSCG training grounds
Behind the House of Football are two football pitches which belong to FSCG. Both have stands with a capacity of 1,000 seats and the main field has floodlights. Montenegro national football team use both stadiums as their training base before every single game.

Because it meets criteria for UEFA games, the main field is often home to Montenegro women's national football team, Montenegro national under-19 football team and Montenegro national under-17 football team games. Teams from the First and Second Montenegrin Leagues can always use the main ground for their matches, which is especially crucial during the stormy days, when their own stadiums are in bad condition.

See also
Camp FSCG
Sport in Montenegro
Football in Montenegro
Football Association of Yugoslavia
Montenegrin First League
Montenegrin Second League
Montenegrin Third League
Montenegrin Women's League
Montenegrin Cup
Montenegrin Cup (women)

References

External links
 Football Association of Montenegro official website
 Montenegro at FIFA site
 Montenegro at UEFA site
 Football Association of South region Montenegro official website
 Football Association of Central region Montenegro official website 
 Football Association of North region Montenegro official website

External links
Official website

Sports governing bodies in Montenegro
Montenegro
Football in Montenegro
Futsal in Montenegro
1931 establishments in Montenegro
Sports organizations established in 1931